Fararat (also Romanized as Farārat) is a town in Juqin Rural District of the Central District of Shahriar County, Tehran province, Iran. At the 2006 National Census, its population was 4,916 in 1,234 households. The following census in 2011 counted 5,240 people in 1,457 households. The latest census in 2016 showed a population of 4,856 people in 1,439 households; it was the largest village in its rural district.

References 

Shahriar County

Populated places in Tehran Province

Populated places in Shahriar County